The Metropolitan Region of Sorocaba is an administrative division of the state of São Paulo in Brazil. It was created in 2014, and consists of the following municipalities:

Alambari
Alumínio
Araçariguama
Araçoiaba da Serra
Boituva
Capela do Alto
Cerquilho
Cesário Lange
Ibiúna
Iperó
Itapetininga
Itu
Jumirim
Mairinque
Piedade
Pilar do Sul
Porto Feliz
Salto
Salto de Pirapora
São Miguel Arcanjo
São Roque
Sarapuí
Sorocaba
Tapiraí
Tatuí
Tietê
Votorantim

References

Sorocaba